The Nordkreis-Liga  (English: Northern district league) was the highest association football league in the German Grand Duchy of Hesse and the Prussian province of Hesse-Nassau from 1909 to 1918. The league was disbanded with the introduction of the Kreisliga Nordmain, Kreisliga Südmain and Kreisliga Hessen in 1919.

History
The league was formed in a move to improve the organisation of football in Southern Germany in the early 1900s. Within the structure of the Southern German football championship, four regional leagues were gradually established from 1908, these being:
 Ostkreis-Liga, covering Bavaria
 Nordkreis-Liga, covering Hesse
 Südkreis-Liga, covering Württemberg, Baden and Alsace
 Westkreis-Liga, covering the Palatinate, Lorraine and the southern Rhine Province

Until then, regional leagues had existed which send their champions to the Kreis finals and, from there, the winners went on to the Southern and German championships.

In 1909, the Nordkreis-Liga was established, consisting of twelve clubs and playing a home-and-away season, these clubs being:
 Viktoria 1894 Hanau
 SV Wiesbaden
 FSV Frankfurt
 FC Hanau 93
 Amicitia Bockenheim
 Kickers Frankfurt
 Kickers Offenbach
 Viktoria Frankfurt
 Germania Bockenheim
 Britannia Frankfurt
 Germania Bieber
 Fvgg Bockenheim

Viktoria 1894 Hanau, the first league champion, qualified thereby for the Southern German championship, where it came last out of four clubs.

In its second year, the league operated with thirteen clubs, with the Germania 94 Frankfurt joining the league. In 1911-12, the league played with twelve clubs again, Amicitia Frankfurt having been disqualified.

In 1912-13, the league was reduced to eight clubs and the Nordkreis champion, for the first time since the interception of the league, didn't come last in the Southern German finals, finishing second instead.

In the last pre-First World War season, 1913–14, things remained unchanged and champions Frankfurter FV finished runners-up in Southern Germany once more.

The war starting in August 1914 meant an end to the league, no championship was played in 1914-15 at all. In the following three seasons, regional leagues operated, like before 1908. A Nordkreis championship as well as a Southern German one was played, but no national title games were held.

With the end of the war in November 1918, football came to a halt once more. New leagues started to operate from 1919 and in the region that previously had formed the Nordkreis, the Kreisliga Nordmain, Kreisliga Südmain and Kreisliga Hessen were formed.

National success
The Nordkreis was one of the weaker regions as football was concerned in this era, taking out no Southern German championships at the time and never qualifying for the German championship.

Southern German championship
Qualified teams and their results:
 1910 German football championship: Viktoria 94 Hanau, 4th
 1911: SV Wiesbaden, 4th
 1912: Frankfurter FV, 4th
 1913: Frankfurter FV, Runners-up
 1914: Frankfurter FV, Runners-up
 1916: FC Hanau 93, Semi-finals
 1917: FSV Frankfurt, 3rd
 1918: Amicitia 02 Frankfurt, Semi-finals

German championship
None qualified.

Winners and runners-up of the Nordkreis-Liga and championship

Placings in the Nordkreis-Liga  1909-14

 1 Viktoria and Kickers merged in 1911 to form Frankfurter FV, which, in turn, formed Eintracht Frankfurt in 1920.

References

Sources
 Fussball-Jahrbuch Deutschland  (8 vol.), Tables and results of the German tier-one leagues 1919-33, publisher: DSFS
 Kicker Almanach,  The yearbook on German football from Bundesliga to Oberliga, since 1937, published by the Kicker Sports Magazine
 Süddeutschlands Fussballgeschichte in Tabellenform 1897-1988  History of Southern German football in tables, publisher & author: Ludolf Hyll

External links
 The Gauligas  Das Deutsche Fussball Archiv 
 German league tables 1892-1933  Hirschi's Fussball seiten
 Germany - Championships 1902-1945 at RSSSF.com

1
1909 establishments in Germany
1918 disestablishments in Germany
Football competitions in Hesse
20th century in Hesse
Southern German football championship
Sports leagues established in 1909
Ger